The Horse Range is a mountain range in Nevada County, California.

References 

Mountain ranges of Northern California
Mountain ranges of Nevada County, California